Jezdimir is a Serbian given name. It is composed of two words: jezditi (to ride) and mir (peace, or in other contexts the world).  It may refer to:

Jezdimir Dangić (1897–1947), Bosnian Serb Chetnik commander
Jezdimir Bogdanski (1930–2007), Yugoslav Partisan
Jezdimir Vasiljević (born 1948), controversial businessman, pyramid-schemer

See also
Jezdimirović, surname
Jezdić, surname

Serbian masculine given names
Slavic masculine given names